Top Billing may refer to:

Top Billing (TV programme), a South African TV series 
Top Billing (magazine), a monthly magazine in South Africa
Billing (performing arts), the order and priority of performing arts credits

See also
"Top Billin'", a 1987 hip-hop single by Audio Two